Frank Beddor (July 31, 1958) is an American former world champion freestyle skier, film producer, actor, stuntman, and author. He worked as a producer on There's Something About Mary and Wicked, and wrote the book The Looking Glass Wars.

Life and career

Beddor grew up in Excelsior, Minnesota. His parents often traveled and by age twelve, Beddor already knew how to barefoot-ski. After winning nationals, Beddor was invited to join the Olympic ski team. He went on tour in Europe for competitive skiing. Beddor was World Champion freestyler skier in 1981 and 1982.

In 1985 Beddor played John Cusack's skiing stunt double in Better Off Dead. Beddor moved to Los Angeles during this period and studied with acting coach Stella Adler. Part of Adler's method was encouraging her students to write the scene the character is in before stepping onstage.

Later, Beddor started his career in producing. He worked as a producer on the 1998 film There's Something About Mary starring Cameron Diaz and Ben Stiller.

Beddor then turned to writing, spending five years writing The Looking Glass Wars. The book was rejected by every major publisher in the US, and ultimately published by Egmont Books in the UK.

The Looking Glass Wars made it on The New York Times weekly list in 2006. The books are based on a re-imagination of Lewis Carroll's novel Alice in Wonderland. The premise of the novel is that the main character Alice in Alice in Wonderland is real, as is the world of Wonderland, but that Carroll misrepresented the events and made Wonderland seem childlike instead of reflecting the reality of Wonderland.

Beddor has written two more books in The Looking Glass Wars series: Seeing Redd and ArchEnemy. A spin-off comic book of this serie called Hatter Madigan was later written by Beddor and Liz Cavalier, with artwork by Ben Templesmith. The spin-off focuses on Hatter Madigan, a character in The Looking Glass Wars.

Beddor was involved in the development of two video games: Card Soldiers Wars in 2008 and The Looking Glass Wars Card Game in 2009.

References

External links

 
 

American children's writers
American fantasy writers
American film producers
American male freestyle skiers
American male novelists
21st-century American novelists
Living people
Year of birth missing (living people)
Place of birth missing (living people)
21st-century American male writers